Hamada or hammada (or Japanese ) may refer to:

Hamada (name), list of people with that name
Hammada, a genus in the family Amaranthaceae
Hamada, a type of barren desert area
Taraka hamada, scientific name for a species of Indian butterfly

Places
Hamada, Shimane, a city in Shimane Prefecture, Japan
Rikuzen-Hamada Station, a rail station in Shiogama, Miyagi, Japan

Arts and entertainment
Hamada (album), a 2009 jazz album by Nils Petter Molvær

See also
Hamadeh (disambiguation)